Blackley  is a suburban area of Manchester, England.

History
The hamlet of Blackley was mentioned in the Domesday Book. The name derives from the Anglo-Saxon Blæclēah = "dark wood" or "dark clearing". In the 13th and 14th centuries Blackley was referred to as Blakeley or Blakelegh. By the Middle Ages, Blackley had become a park belonging to the lords of Manchester.'

Its value in 1282 was recorded as £6 13s 4d, a sum approximately equivalent in buying power to £333,500 today. The lords of Manchester leased the land from time to time. In 1473, John Byron held the leases on Blackley village, Blackley field and Pillingworth fields at an annual rent of £33 6s 8d.

The Byron family continued to hold the land until the beginning of the 17th century when Blackley was sold in parcels to a number of landowners. By the middle of the 17th century, Blackley was a rural village of just 107 inhabitants.

There was gradual residential development in the 1930s to 1960s, where most farmland was built upon.

Today, only pockets of the suburb are undeveloped green space, with farmland remaining close to the Manchester Ring Motorway.

Blackley has an important history in the chemical industry, starting with the Borelle Dyeworks founded by Angel Raphael Louis Delaunay in 1785 and run by ICI, who expanded it as a research centre for chemicals and pharmaceuticals. There were several other dye and chemical works. Connolly's Ltd made telecommunication cabling, later becoming part of BICC.

Governance
Blackley, since 2010, has been part of the parliamentary constituency of Blackley and Broughton.  The current Member of Parliament is Graham Stringer (Labour), who was first elected in 1997 for the predecessor constituency Manchester Blackley. 
The candidate of the  Conservative Party came second in the general election of 2019, with 24.6% of the vote compared to Stringer's 61.9%.

The suburb is split between the local government wards of Higher Blackley and Charlestown on Manchester City Council. The three councillors for both wards are members of the Labour Party.

Economy
During the 1930s, residential development started to take place in the formerly rural village to provide more homes for Manchester's growing population. It became an area with a mixture of housing: mainly privately owned homes for owner occupation and private renting. In 2014, Blackley appeared on a list of Top 10 Places to Live In Greater Manchester. 

The suburb is popular for commuters into Manchester City Centre. The few opportunities to work in the suburb itself include the Hexagon Tower Development, close to North Manchester Hospital, which is a centre for scientific research into plastics and related innovation.

The church of Saint Peter

The Church of St Peter on Old Market Street is a Gothic Revival church, which was built in 1844 by E. H. Shellard. It was erected at a cost of £3162. It was designated a Grade II* listed building on 20 June 1988. The interior is aisled and particularly impressive for its complete 170 year old interior, with the extremely unusual survival of all the fine boxes and pews.

The churchyard contains the war graves of ten service personnel of World War I, and seven of World War II.

Green spaces
Blackley has several green spaces:

Boggart Hole Clough
Boggart Hole Clough is a large woodland and urban country park. The park has a bowling green, tennis and basketball courts, a boating lake and a children's play area. It has its own permanent orienteering course and an athletics track. There is an old stone bridge across the brook running through the clough.

The clough was designated a local nature reserve in 2008.

Blackley Forest
A Site of Biological Importance and an example of one of the country's first Community Woodlands. It was planted to commemorate the Queen's coronation and also local people killed in the Second World War. The area has had woodland on it since the Norman Conquest in 1066, when there were wild boar, deer and eagles.

The forest is a mix of woodland, grassland and wetlands, with a network of paths and steps. The stretch of the River Irk in the forest is fringed by birch trees with some colonies of autumn crocus.

Heaton Park
It is the grounds of Heaton Hall, a Grade I listed, neoclassical 18th century country mansion. The hall was remodelled to a design by James Wyatt in 1772, and is open to the public as a museum and events venue.

Although the park is officially part of the City of Manchester, two of a number of entrances are accessed from the suburb of Blackley, on Middleton Road.

Transport
Blackley is well served by buses primarily along the main arterial routes of Rochdale Road (A664), and Cheetham Hill Road/Bury Old Road (A665) directly to and from Manchester city centre. Initially these would have been provided by the precursors to, and Manchester Carriage and Tramways Company, and currently by First Greater Manchester.

Other journeys are provided by Stagecoach Manchester, which took over JPT in April 2014. There are frequent Metrolink trams from Bowker Vale to and from Manchester city centre and as far south as Altrincham and as far north as Bury. Manchester's M60 orbital motorway is the northern boundary of Blackley.

Education

Primary schools 
Blackley has a number of primary schools, which include:
 Charlestown Community Primary School
 Crab Lane Primary School
 Crosslee Community Primary School
 Holy Trinity CE Primary School
 Mount Carmel RC Primary School
 Pike Fold Primary School
 St Clare's RC Primary School
 St John Bosco RC Primary School
 Victoria Avenue Primary School

Secondary schools
 The Co-operative Academy of Manchester
 The Co-operative Academy North Manchester
 Our Lady's RC High School.

There are nearest secondary schools, including Manchester Communication Academy.

Special and Alternative Schools
 Camberwell Park School
 Manchester Hospital Schools
 North Ridge High School

Sports

Blackley Golf Club

The award-winning Blackley Golf Club has occupied its present site close to the M60 since 1937. The club celebrated its centenary in 2007, and a new clubhouse opened in 2009. The clubhouse offers use for wedding receptions and private hire. There is a golf shop, open to club members and the public.

The course's green is separated by fields from the motorway. A public footpath runs along the perimeter.

Blackley Cricket Club

Blackley Cricket Club currently plays in the Greater Manchester Cricket League. The club is located on Crab Lane. It won the cricket league title for Greater Manchester in 2009.

Notable people 

(either born in Blackley, or resident of Blackley)

John Monks, Baron Monks of Blackley: Member of the House of Lords. Former General Secretary, TUC
Hasney Aljofree, Swindon Town footballer
John Bradford, Protestant martyr
Northside singer, Warren “Dermo” Dermody
Stephen Bywater, professional footballer
Howard Davies, Economist and Author: Current Chairman of the Royal Bank of Scotland and former director of the London School of Economics.
David Heyes, Labour Politician: Former Labour MP for Ashton-under-Lyne 
Bernard Hill, actor of film, stage and television
Jon Macken, former Manchester United and Manchester City footballer
Bernard Manning, comedian
Wilf McGuinness, former Manchester United player and manager
Joe McIntyre, Former Professional Footballer
Malcolm Roberts, Musician, Entertainer and Eurovision contestant. 
Roger Byrne, captain of Manchester United, and one of eight players who died in the Munich air disaster, of February 1958. 
Peter Townley, Church of England Archdeacon – current Archdeacon of Pontefract
Vini Reilly, Musician: The Durutti Column

See also

Listed buildings in Manchester-M9

References

External links
Blackley - Districts & Suburbs of Manchester
Friends of Blackley Forest
St. Peter's & St. Paul's Churches
St. Andrew's Church, Higher Blackley
Heaton Park

Areas of Manchester